Nariman Magomedovich Israpilov (born 23 February 1988 in Kayakent, Dagestan) is a Kumyk freestyle wrestler from Russia. He competes in the 66 kg division and won the gold medal in the same division at the 2013 Summer Universiade defeating Samat Nadyrbek Uulu of Kyrgyzstan. Golden Grand-prix Baku 2016 runner-up.

References

Russian male sport wrestlers
1988 births
Living people
World Wrestling Championships medalists
Universiade medalists in wrestling
Kumyks
Universiade gold medalists for Russia
Medalists at the 2013 Summer Universiade
Sportspeople from Dagestan